Assyrian Canadians are Canadians of Assyrian descent or Assyrians who have Canadian citizenship. According to the 2011 Census there were 10,810 Canadians who claimed Assyrian ancestry, an increase compared to the 8,650 in the 2006 Census.

They are the indigenous pre-Arab and pre-Turkic people of northern Iraq, southeast Turkey, northeastern Syria, and northwest Iran, who speak dialects of Eastern Aramaic and are mainly Christian, although some are irreligious. Although most come from the aforementioned countries, many Assyrians have immigrated to Canada from Jordan, Georgia and Armenia as well.

History

The "Presby-Assyrians" 
Battleford's News-Optimist on June 22, 1979 noted that, “The Canadian West has no greater settlement story than that of the Assyrians who landed on Canadian soil on January 1, 1903.”

Reverend Dr. Isaac Adams organized two groups of Assyrian immigrants from Urmia, one in 1903 and 1906. Unlike many other immigrant groups at the time, the settlers were composed of families and not just men. They were the first Presbyterians in the region. 

The Presbyterian Record, on January 1, 2008, the anniversary of the arrival of the Assyrian settlers, entitled their commemorative article: "Presby-Assyrians: they escaped persecution to form a unique community in Saskatchewan", connoting their religious and ethnic heritage.

Reasons for immigrating 
Most Assyrians arrived in Canada due to both ethnic persecution and religious persecution, mainly from their ancient ancestral Assyrian homeland in northern Iraq, southeast Turkey, northeast Syria and northwest Iran. The migration to Canada may be broken up into a number of distinct periods: early settlement and the subsequent waves of migration sparked by the Assyrian genocide in present-day Turkey and Iran, the Iranian Revolution of 1979 and, more recently, the Iraq War and Syrian Civil War. The last 2006 Census Canada counted 8,650

The first period of known mass-migration came just after the Assyrian genocide in the dying days of the Turkish Ottoman Empire. The second and perhaps largest wave of migration into came during the Iran–Iraq War. Under the shadow of war, Saddam Hussein's al-Anfal Campaign constituted a major force for migration for Iraq's Assyrian population.

Activism 
In 2014 after the ISIS attacks on the Nineveh plains, a rally on behalf of Assyrian genocide recognition was organized by Ramsin Ishaq in Windsor, Ontario at the City Hall. Over 100 attendants, mostly Assyrian Christians, came out to rally the Canadian government to create an Assyrian State, through the UN. The rally received the support of Brian Masse of the NDP who spoke briefly, as well as a priest from the local Greek Orthodox Church.

Assyrian population in Canada by province and territory

See also
 Middle Eastern Canadians
 West Asian Canadians
 Assyrian–Chaldean–Syriac diaspora
 Assyrians in the United States
 Ethnic origins of people in Canada

References 

Assyrian Chaldean Syriac
Canada
Assyrian ethnic groups
Ethnoreligious groups in Canada
 
West Asian Canadians